The Russian Fourth Army was a World War I Russian field army that fought on the Eastern Front.

Composition
At the beginning of the war, the army consisted of:

Field Office (HQ 4th Army) (formed on August 2, 1914 at the headquarters of the Kazan Military District)
Grenadier Corps
14th Army Corps
16th Army Corps
3rd Caucasian Corps (transferred from Third Army)

At the end of 1917:
 8th Army Corps

Deployment
Southwestern Front (August 1914 – June 1915)
Northwestern Front (June–August 1915)
Western Front (August 1915 – October 1916)
Romanian Front (December 1916 – early 1918)

Commanders
19.07.1914 – 22.08.1914 - General of Infantry Baron Anton von Saltza
22.08.1914 – 20.08.1915 - General of Infantry Alexei Evert
30.08.1915 – 21.11.1917 - General of Infantry Alexander Ragoza

See also
List of Imperial Russian Army formations and units

References

Armies of the Russian Empire
Military units and formations established in 1914
1914 establishments in the Russian Empire
Military units and formations disestablished in 1917